The 1912–13 South Carolina Gamecocks men's basketball team represents University of South Carolina during the 1912–13 NCAA men's basketball season. The head coach was James G. Driver coaching the Gamecocks in his second season.

Schedule

References

South Carolina Gamecocks men's basketball seasons
South Carolina
South Carol
South Carol